Country Jam USA is a 3-day annual country music festival held in Eau Claire, Wisconsin. The first festival was held in 1990, making Country Jam USA one of the longest-running festivals in the country.

The outdoor music festival features country music's top artists as well as up-and-coming and local talent, making it a popular choice with music lovers of all ages. There are many ways to attend and enjoy the festival including Country Club and VIP plus Party Pit tickets to see favorite artists right in front of the stage. Attendees also commonly camp within the nearby Whispering Pines campground.

This music festival is held annually in Eau Claire, Wisconsin.

History
Country Jam USA was founded in Eau Claire, Wisconsin in 1989. The festival was once known as Shake Rattle 'n Roll but with increasing demands and growth in the country music industry, it expanded into the outdoor music festival it is today. The first Country Jam  festival took place in 1990 and was held in Eau Claire, Wisconsin. With its thriving success, the owners expanded west in 1992 with the first Colorado Country Jam in Grand Junction which now operates under separate management. The Blue Ox Music Festival was added to the Country Jam family in 2016 and now also operates under separate management. The premier festival, Country Jam USA continues to showcase the hottest headliners and buzz-worthy artists, making it one of the must-see attractions in the Midwest.

Country Jam USA's previous lineups have included some of the biggest names in country music including: Keith Urban, Eric Church, Blake Shelton, Lady Antebellum, Dirks Bentley, Kenny Chesney, Jake Owen, Florida Georgia Line, Billy Currington, Sugarland, Willie Nelson, Alan Jackson, Tim McGraw, Faith Hill, Clint Black and Gary Allen.

Location
The Country Jam USA festival site is located between the lush forests of west-central Wisconsin and the meandering Chippewa River. Country Jam USA appreciates the natural scenery and offers camping for festival-goers under the secluded pine trees in the area or in the lush fields nearby.

Awards and honors
 1995: nominee for Special Event of the Year, Country Music Association
 2015: Community Development Award from the Eau Claire Chamber of Commerce

Lineups by year

See also
Country Jam Ranch

References

External links
Country Jam USA

Music festivals established in 1990
Country music festivals in the United States
Music festivals in Wisconsin
Rock festivals in the United States
Tourist attractions in Eau Claire County, Wisconsin